1848 Democratic National Committee was the Democratic Party's first continuing national organization with one member from each state appointed for four years at the 1848 nominating convention in Baltimore.

B. F. Hallett was the Chairman and W. F. Ritchie was Secretary.

References

Democratic Party (United States) organizations
Democratic National Committee, 1848